The 2020–21 NCAA Division I men's basketball season began on November 25, 2020, and concluded on March 14, 2021. The 2021 NCAA Division I men's basketball tournament culminated the season and began on March 18 and concluded on April 5.

Season headlines
 November 11 – The Associated Press preseason All-American team was released. Iowa center Luka Garza was the lone unanimous selection (64 votes). Joining him on the team were Baylor guard Jared Butler, Illinois guard Ayo Dosunmu, Oklahoma State guard Cade Cunningham, Gonzaga guard Corey Kispert (26), and Arizona State guard Remy Martin (26).
 November 15 – The UT Martin Skyhawks announced that head coach Anthony Stewart, who had been set to start his fifth season with the Skyhawks, had died earlier that day. No cause of death was given at the time.
 January 18 – When the AP Poll's Week 9 top 25 rankings were released, it was the first time since December 18, 1961, that neither Duke, Kentucky, nor North Carolina were included on the list. In 1961, the poll was only composed of the top 10 teams.
 February 7 – The UTRGV Vaqueros announce the death of fifth-year head coach Lew Hill from coronavirus. Longtime assistant Jai Steadman was named interim head coach four days later.
 February 9 – For the first time since an 0–2 start to the 1999–2000 season, the Duke men's basketball team fell below .500 after an 89–93 loss to Notre Dame.
 March 23 – Just three days after playing in the NCAA tournament, Grand Canyon senior Oscar Frayer died in a car crash, along with his sister and one other person.

COVID-19 pandemic-related
 October 14 – The NCAA announced that all student-athletes in winter sports during the 2020–21 school year, including men's and women's basketball, would receive an extra year of athletic eligibility, whether or not they or their teams play during that school year.
 October 27 – Bethune–Cookman, which had previously canceled its 2020 fall sports due to COVID-19 concerns, announced that none of its other teams, including men's and women's basketball, would play in the 2020–21 school year.
 November 12 – The Ivy League became the first conference to cancel all winter sports for the 2020–21 season, including men's and women's basketball, due to COVID-19 concerns.
 November 19 – Maryland Eastern Shore became the second MEAC program to opt out of the 2020–21 men's and women's basketball seasons due to COVID-19 concerns.
 December 23 – Chicago State ended its 2020–21 season after an 0–9 start marked by many COVID-19-related issues. Head coach Lance Irvin opted out before the season started due to concerns over the disease; the Cougars played one game with only six available players and another with only seven; the team's final game before suspending its season was canceled due to a lack of players.
 February 9 – Howard ended its 2020–21 season after a 1–4 start of an abundance of caution due to the health and safety concerns related to the COVID-19 pandemic.
 February 11 – Organizers of the CollegeInsider.com Postseason Tournament announced that the 2021 edition had been canceled.
 February 13 – Maine decided to conclude their 2020–21 season due to challenges related to COVID-19 after not being cleared to practice or play a game since January 17.
 February 23 – Charleston Southern ended its 2020–21 season after a 3–18 start, citing player concerns over COVID–19.
 February 26 – Jacksonville ended its 2020–21 season after an 11–13 start, citing player concerns over COVID–19.
 March 2 – Holy Cross ended its 2020–21 season after a 5–11 start, citing player concerns over COVID-19.

Milestones and records
During the season, the following players reached the 2,000 career point milestone – Austin Peay swingman Terry Taylor, Pepperdine guard Colbey Ross, Iowa center Luka Garza, Bowling Green guard Justin Turner, Detroit Mercy guard Antoine Davis, UTSA guard Keaton Wallace, and Davidson guard Kellan Grady.
 November 30 – Kansas took sole possession of the record for most consecutive weeks ranked in the AP Poll. The Jayhawks' 222nd straight appearance surpassed UCLA's 221 from 1966 to 1980. The Jayhawks' streak ended at 231 when they dropped out of the poll released on February 8.
 December 1 – UC Riverside head coach Mike Magpayo became the first head coach of Asian or Filipino descent to coach and won a Division I game in their 57–42 victory over Washington. Magpayo had missed the Highlanders' season opener on November 25 against Pacific due to his child's birth.
 February 21 – Iowa center Luka Garza scored 23 points in a win against Penn State to become the school's all-time leading scorer, breaking a 32-year old record previously held by Roy Marble (2,116 points).

Conference membership changes
Ten schools joined a new conference for the 2020–21 season with four schools leaving Division II for Division I.

Arenas

New arenas
 James Madison opened the new Atlantic Union Bank Center on November 25, 2020, defeating Division II Limestone 89–55.
 Liberty played its first game at Liberty Arena, winning 78–62 over Saint Francis (PA) on December 3, 2020. The first event at the arena, which had officially opened on November 23, was a women's game on December 1.

Arenas of new D-I teams
Three of the four new D-I members for this season are using existing on-campus facilities:
 Dixie State plays in Burns Arena.
 Tarleton State plays in Wisdom Gym.
 UC San Diego plays in RIMAC Arena.
The other D-I newcomer, Bellarmine, announced a multi-year deal with the Kentucky State Fair Board on November 2, 2020, to play home games at Freedom Hall, located at the Kentucky Exposition Center near Louisville Muhammad Ali International Airport. The arena had been home to Louisville for more than 50 years before that team moved to the downtown KFC Yum! Center in 2010. Due to COVID-19 restrictions, Bellarmine could only seat 300 at its on-campus facility, Knights Hall. With Freedom Hall's basketball capacity of 18,252, the Knights were able to seat 2,700.

Arenas closing
 High Point had originally planned to open Nido and Mariana Qubein Arena and Conference Center for the 2020–21 season. However, construction delays brought on by COVID-19 led to the university delaying the new arena's opening until 2021–22, meaning that the Millis Center was in use for one more season.
 This was intended to be Idaho's final season at the Kibbie Dome, a facility also home to Idaho football, with its basketball configuration known as Cowan Spectrum. When Idaho moved its 2020 football season to spring 2021, it displaced the men's and women's basketball teams, forcing them to use Memorial Gymnasium. The latter facility had been home to both basketball teams before the Kibbie Dome opened in 1976, and remained a part-time home for both. The school plans to open the new Idaho Central Credit Union Arena for the 2021–22 season. The Dome will remain in use for football and several other sports.

Temporary arenas
 Due to COVID-19 restrictions in Santa Clara County, Santa Clara and Stanford played the majority of their home games at Kaiser Permanente Arena in neighboring Santa Cruz County.

Season outlook

Pre-season polls

The top 25 from the AP and USA Today Coaches Polls.

Regular season top 10 matchups
Rankings reflect the AP poll Top 25.

November 26
No. 1 Gonzaga defeated No. 6 Kansas, 102–90 (Fort Myers Tip-Off, Suncoast Credit Union Arena, Fort Myers, FL)
December 1
No. 8 Michigan State defeated No. 6 Duke, 75–69 (Champions Classic, Cameron Indoor Stadium, Durham, NC)
December 2
No. 2 Baylor defeated No. 5 Illinois, 82–69 (Jimmy V Classic, Bankers Life Fieldhouse, Indianapolis, IN)
December 8
No. 5 Kansas defeated No. 8 Creighton, 73–72 (Big East–Big 12 Battle, Allen Fieldhouse, Lawrence, KS)
No. 6 Illinois defeated No. 10 Duke, 83–68 (ACC–Big Ten Challenge, Cameron Indoor Stadium, Durham, NC)
December 19
No. 1 Gonzaga defeated No. 3 Iowa, 99–88 (Sanford Pentagon, Sioux Falls, SD)
December 22
No. 3 Kansas defeated No. 7 West Virginia, 79–65 (Allen Fieldhouse, Lawrence, KS)
January 2
No. 8 Texas defeated No. 3 Kansas, 84–59 (Allen Fieldhouse, Lawrence, KS)
January 12
No. 7 Michigan defeated No. 9 Wisconsin, 77–54 (Crisler Arena, Ann Arbor, MI)
January 18
No. 2 Baylor defeated No. 9 Kansas, 77–69 (Ferrell Center, Waco, TX)
February 2
No. 2 Baylor defeated No. 6 Texas, 83–69 (Frank Erwin Center, Austin, TX)
February 4
No. 7 Ohio State defeated No. 8 Iowa, 89–85 (Carver-Hawkeye Arena, Iowa City, IA)
February 21
No. 3 Michigan defeated No. 4 Ohio State, 92–87 (Value City Arena, Columbus, OH)
February 25
No. 3 Michigan defeated No. 9 Iowa, 79–57 (Crisler Arena, Ann Arbor, MI)
February 28
No. 9 Iowa defeated No. 4 Ohio State, 73–57 (Value City Arena, Columbus, OH)
March 2
No. 3 Baylor defeated No. 6 West Virginia, 94–89 OT (WVU Coliseum, Morgantown, WV)
No. 4 Illinois defeated No. 2 Michigan, 76–53 (Crisler Arena, Ann Arbor, MI)
March 6
No. 4 Illinois defeated No. 7 Ohio State, 73–68 (Value City Arena, Columbus, OH)
March 13
No. 3 Illinois defeated No. 5 Iowa, 82–71 (2021 Big Ten men's basketball tournament, Lucas Oil Stadium, Indianapolis, IN)
No. 9 Ohio State defeated No. 4 Michigan, 68–67 (2021 Big Ten Men's Basketball Tournament, Lucas Oil Stadium, Indianapolis)
March 14
No. 3 Illinois defeated No. 9 Ohio State, 91–88 OT (2021 Big Ten Men's Basketball Tournament, Lucas Oil Stadium, Indianapolis)

Regular season

Early season tournaments 
The Battle 4 Atlantis tournament in Nassau, Bahamas was cancelled due to logistical issues associated with COVID-19. A new tournament known as the Crossover Classic is scheduled to be held at the Sanford Pentagon in Sioux Falls, South Dakota, and had invited almost all of the teams that had originally planned to compete in the Battle 4 Atlantis tournament (although five teams would later drop out).

On October 26, 2020, ESPN Events cancelled 10 early-season tournaments that it organizes. It had planned to hold them at the ESPN Wide World of Sports Complex in Orlando within a protected "bubble" (the same site had recently hosted the remainder of the 2019–20 NBA season under similar circumstances), but The Athletic reported that there had been disagreements over health and COVID-19 testing protocols that had been mandated by ESPN Events (in accordance with recommendations by the CDC), which were stricter than those being adopted by conferences.

Upsets
Teams listed in bold type won "true road games", defined as games held at an opponent's regular home court (including regularly used alternate homes).

In addition to the above listed upsets in which an unranked team defeated a ranked team, there were eleven non-Division I teams to defeat a Division I team this season. Bold type indicates winning teams in "true road games"—i.e., those played on an opponent's home court (including secondary homes).

Conference winners and tournaments
Each of the 31 Division I athletic conferences that played in 2020–21 ended its regular season with a single-elimination tournament. The team with the best regular-season record in each conference was given the number one seed in each tournament, with tiebreakers used as needed in the case of ties for the top seeding. The winners of these tournaments received automatic invitations to the 2021 NCAA Division I men's basketball tournament.

Statistical leaders

Postseason

NCAA tournament

Tournament upsets
For this list, an "upset" is defined as a win by a team seeded 7 or more spots below its defeated opponent. This is more restrictive than the NCAA's official definition, in which a difference of 5 seed lines is sufficient to declare an "upset".

Teams eliminated from postseason participation due to COVID-19
 March 5 – Northern Iowa
 March 9 – FIU
 March 11 – Duke
 March 12 – North Carolina A&T

Conference standings

Award winners

2021 Consensus All-America team

Major player of the year awards
Wooden Award: Luka Garza, Iowa
Naismith Award: Luka Garza, Iowa
Associated Press Player of the Year: Luka Garza, Iowa
NABC Player of the Year: Luka Garza, Iowa
Oscar Robertson Trophy (USBWA): Luka Garza, Iowa
Sporting News Player of the Year: Luka Garza, Iowa

Major freshman of the year awards
Wayman Tisdale Award (USBWA): Cade Cunningham, Oklahoma State
 NABC Freshman of the Year: Cade Cunningham, Oklahoma State
 Sporting News Freshman of the Year: Cade Cunningham, Oklahoma State

Major coach of the year awards
Associated Press Coach of the Year: Juwan Howard, Michigan
Henry Iba Award (USBWA): Juwan Howard, Michigan
NABC Coach of the Year: Mark Few, Gonzaga
Naismith College Coach of the Year: Mark Few, Gonzaga
 Sporting News Coach of the Year: Juwan Howard, Michigan

Other major awards
 Naismith Starting Five:
 Bob Cousy Award (best point guard): Ayo Dosunmu, Illinois
 Jerry West Award (best shooting guard): Chris Duarte, Oregon
 Julius Erving Award (best small forward): Corey Kispert, Gonzaga
 Karl Malone Award (best power forward): Drew Timme, Gonzaga
 Kareem Abdul-Jabbar Award (best center): Luka Garza, Iowa
Pete Newell Big Man Award (best big man): Luka Garza, Iowa
 NABC Defensive Player of the Year: Davion Mitchell, Baylor
 Naismith Defensive Player of the Year: Davion Mitchell, Baylor
Senior CLASS Award (top senior on and off the court): Luka Garza, Iowa
Robert V. Geasey Trophy (top player in Philadelphia Big 5): Collin Gillespie, Villanova
Haggerty Award (top player in NYC metro area): Sandro Mamukelashvili, Seton Hall
Ben Jobe Award (top minority coach): Leonard Hamilton, Florida State
Hugh Durham Award (top mid-major coach): Byron Smith, Prairie View A&M
Jim Phelan Award (top head coach): Todd Simon, Southern Utah
Lefty Driesell Award (top defensive player): Davion Mitchell, Baylor
Lou Henson Award (top mid-major player): Max Abmas, Oral Roberts
Lute Olson Award (top non-freshman or transfer player): Luka Garza, Iowa
Skip Prosser Man of the Year Award (coach with moral character): Lew Hill, UTRGV
Academic All-American of the Year (top scholar-athlete): Corey Kispert, Gonzaga
Elite 90 Award (top GPA among upperclass players at Final Four): Russell Stong, UCLA
Perry Wallace Most Courageous Award:  This award was not presented to a Division I basketball figure. The award went to the men's basketball team of NAIA Bluefield College, which decided to kneel during the pregame playing of the national anthem on February 8, 2021, in defiance of orders from the college's president.

Coaching changes
56 teams changed coaches during the season and after it ended. Two schools changed coaches between their first practice and first game of the season. One coach resigned and one died.

See also
2020–21 NCAA Division I women's basketball season

References

 
NCAA Division I Men